Diego de la Cruz (fl. 1482-1500) was a Spanish painter who may have been of Flemish origin. He was active in Burgos and the neighboring region.

Biography 
He was long forgotten, until being rediscovered in 1966, thanks to a study by José Gudiol Ricart, who proposed that he was born in Flanders around 1460 and arrived in Spain before the first group of Flemish painters arrived, led by Juan de Flandes. Other researchers, such as  presumed that he was born in Spain; probably Castile. This viewpoint was supported by Didier Martens (born 1960), who published a study on the subject in 2001. The influence upon his work by painters of the Burgundian Netherlands, such as Rogier van der Weyden, especially in his treatment of light, may be explained by their presence in Spain, rather than by his origins. Even Guidol suggests that he began as a sculptor and may have started his artistic career in the workshop of Gil de Siloé, who is believed to have been born in Antwerp.

His artistic personality is largely defined by two works: Cristo de Varón de Dolores entre la Virgen y San Juan, at the Museo del Prado; his only signed work, probably created between 1475-1480, and the Estigmatización de San Francisco de Asís at the Iglesia de San Esteban de Burgos (1487-1489).

References

Further reading
 Azcárate, José María, Arte gótico en España, Madrid, 2000, Cátedra,  pg. 391.
 Martens, Didier, "Diego de la Cruz, cuarenta años después de su redescubrimiento: balance de las investigaciones y nuevas propuestas", in: Goya, 283-284 (2001), pgs. 208-222.
 Silva Maroto, Pilar, Donación Várez Fisa, Madrid, Museo Nacional del Prado, 2013,  pg.38.

External links

 Diego de la Cruz @ the Museo del Prado

Spanish painters
15th-century Spanish painters
Religious artists
People from Burgos